The Northern Cyclones are a junior ice hockey organization playing in the United States Premier Hockey League. The team plays their home games at the Cyclones Arena, located in Hudson, New Hampshire.

The Cyclones organization also fields junior-level developmental teams in the USPHL's Premier and Elite Division (and formerly in the Metropolitan Junior Hockey League and Eastern Hockey League-Elite Division) and youth hockey select teams at the Midget U18, Midget 16U, Bantam, Peewee, and Squirt and other various levels as well as the Lady Cyclones U12, U16, and U18 teams.

Alumni   
The Northern Cyclones have produced a number of alumni playing in higher levels of junior hockey, NCAA Division I, Division III college programs.

Season-by-season records

USA Hockey Tier III Junior National Championships
Round robin play in pool with top 4 teams advancing to semifinal.

* - Although the Connecticut Oilers were EHL champions in 2015, the Cyclones were the EHL representative due to paperwork issues with Oilers' import players

References

External links
 Cyclones Home Page
 Eastern Hockey League - Official website

Hudson, New Hampshire
Ice hockey teams in New Hampshire
Ice hockey clubs established in 2004
2004 establishments in New Hampshire